Remit, REMIT, or derivations thereof may refer to:

Terms related to remittance 
 Remittance, a transfer of money by a foreign worker to an individual in his or her home country
 Remittance advice, a letter sent by a customer to a supplier informing them that their invoice has been paid
 Remittance man, an emigrant in the 19th century, often to a British colony, supported or assisted by payment of money from their paternal home

Acronyms 
 REMIT, Regulation on Wholesale Energy Market Integrity and Transparency, a European Union regulation for energy markets